The Samsung M8800, marketed as Samsung Pixon and previously referred to as Samsung Bresson, is a high-spec mobile phone from Samsung released in September 2008, one of the first 8-megapixel camera phones (but after the Samsung i8510 Innov8). The phone does not have Wi-Fi connectivity, unlike some competitors like LG Renoir

The phone has:
Internet browser
Accelerometer for automatic display rotation
Front and rear cameras
Video calling
Calculator
Music player

References

External links
Official site

M8800
Mobile phones introduced in 2008